Sneem is a village situated on the Iveragh Peninsula (part of the Ring of Kerry), in County Kerry, in the southwest of Ireland. It lies on the estuary of the River Sneem. National route N70 runs through the town. While the 2016 census recorded a population of 288 people, Sneem is located in a tourist area and the population increases during the summer months.

Name
The Irish village name  means "the knot" in English. Several explanations of the name have been offered:
One is that a knot-like swirling is said to take place where the River Sneem meets the currents of Kenmare Bay in the estuary, just below the village.
Another notes that Sneem village comprises two squares, North and South. A bridge in the middle of the village, viewed from overhead, acts as a knot between the two squares.
A less common explanation is that Sneem is the knot in the scenic Ring of Kerry.

History
A Topographical Dictionary of Ireland, published by Samuel Lewis in 1837, states that at the time, Sneem consisted of a harbour, a collection of houses, a church, a chapel and a "constabulary police force".

Former French president Charles de Gaulle visited Sneem in May 1969, and monument to him now stands in the village's North Square.

A book, Sneem, The Knot in the Ring, recounts the area's history. In 2000, a time capsule was buried in the centre of the town, to be opened in 2100.

Politics
The village is in the South and West Kerry electoral area of Kerry County Council, and the Dáil Éireann constituency of Kerry.

Historic buildings and places

Derryquin castle
Derryquin Castle was an 18th-century stone-built country house, now demolished, in the Parknasilla estate close to Sneem. Designed by local architect James Franklin Fuller, the house comprised a three storey main block with a four storey octagonal tower rising through the centre and a two storey, partly curved wing. The building was equipped with battlements and machicolations.

Rossdohan house
Rossdohan House on Rossdohan Island was built c.1875-1881 by architect John Pollard Seddon for Dr. Samuel Thomas Heard, a surgeon who had recently retired from his role in British Raj-era India and bought the island. It was burned down in 1922 and a new house built on the site in 1946 by architect Michael John Scott in the Dutch Cape style (resembling Groot Constantia in Cape Town). This second house was burnt down in 1955 and has remained a ruin since. Rossdohan Island and the remaining estate have a mixture of tree ferns and exotic plants still extant, many dating from the late 1800s.

People
 Cearbhall Ó Dálaigh, former President, lived nearby before his death; his state funeral was held in Sneem in March 1978
 Steve Casey, and his brothers Tom and Jim, were Irish athletes of the 1930s who competed in single scull rowing at the Charles River in Boston. As well as being a rower, Steve Casey was both NWA and AWA heavyweight wrestling champion of the world five times between 1938 and 1947. There is a statue commemorating him in the village.
 William Melville, the first head of the British Secret Service, was born at nearby Direenaclaurig Cross.
 John Egan, Kerry Gaelic footballer, played for Sneem GAA. He won six All-Ireland medals, four of which were consecutive, and five GAA All Stars Awards. Several years after his death in 2012, a life-size bronze statue of Egan was erected in Sneem's South Square.
 Ronan Hussey, also a Sneem Gaelic footballer, has been a member of the Kerry senior football panel.

See also

List of towns and villages in Ireland
Sneem Black Pudding

References

External links
Sneem.com – village web portal
Sneem.ie – community website
The Tidy Towns of Ireland "Celebrating 50 years"

Towns and villages in County Kerry
Articles on towns and villages in Ireland possibly missing Irish place names
Iveragh Peninsula